Ei ole üksi ükski maa ('No Land Is Alone') is an Estonian patriotic song, which was created in 1987 by Alo Mattiisen. The lyrics were created by Jüri Leesment. The song was created in order to support movement against phoshorite mining in Virumaa (so called Phosphorite War).

The song is repeatedly represented in major music festivals in Estonia, e.g. in 2002 in IX Youth Singing Festival.

Lyrics

Tujurikkuja version 

At the end of 2015, a younger generation of singers performed a remake in the satirical program Tujurikkuja in the manner of Mattiisen, which ironized the widespread intolerance towards refugees, gays and simply other Estonians. The text written by Märt Avandi, Ott Sepp and Õ-Fraktsioon also alluded to other political issues, such as the Syrian civil war.

References

External links
 Song in YouTube, original version in 1987

Estonian songs
Estonian patriotic songs
1987 songs